Jean Alfred, Ph.D. (March 10, 1940 – July 20, 2015) was a politician in Quebec, Canada. He was a member of the National Assembly of Quebec as a member of the Parti Québécois from 1976 to 1981.

Alfred was born in Ouanaminthe, Haiti, to Oracius Alfred and Prunelie Occean. He completed his college studies and some university courses at Port-au-Prince before moving to Ottawa, where he obtained a degree in philosophy from the University of Ottawa. He also received a master's degree in psycho-pedagogy as well as a Ph.D. in education.

Prior to his entry into politics, he taught for several years in Haiti and in the Outaouais region. He taught again after his political career and was a school board commissioner for the Commission Scolaire des Draveurs.

In 1975, he was elected as a councillor for Gatineau City Council and later entered provincial politics where he was elected in Papineau as a Parti Québécois candidate, becoming the first Black person to be elected to the National Assembly of Quebec. He served a full term as a PQ and Independent member but was defeated in the newly formed riding of Chapleau which portions were split from Gatineau and Papineau. He was a candidate again in 1989, but lost to the Liberal, John Kehoe. He made a brief attempt at federal politics but failed to become a Bloc Québécois prior to the 1997 elections.

Electoral record (partial)

External links
 

1940 births
2015 deaths
Gatineau city councillors
Haitian Quebecers
Haitian emigrants to Canada
Naturalized citizens of Canada
Parti Québécois MNAs
People from Nord-Est (department)
University of Ottawa alumni
Black Canadian politicians